Fancy is the third and final studio album by the American experimental rock band Idiot Flesh.

Track listing

Personnel
Idiot Flesh
Nils Frykdahl – vocals, guitar, flute, castanets; design
Gene Jun – vocals, violin, guitar, metal objects
Dan Rathbun – bass, vocals, cello, horn, trombone, saw; engineer
Wes Anderson – drums, percussion, marimba, bassoon, vocals
Side Show Freaks
Paul Dal Porto - "Helpy the Hamburger Bee", Sitar, vocals
Lorrie Murray - Hatcha, The Siamese Twin, Fire eater/torch swinger, vocals
Heidi Good - Datcha, The Siamese Twin, Fire eater/torch swinger, vocals
Brad Caswell - Puppet Show

Guest musicians
Mantra Ben Y'akova – vocals
Erik Carter – guitar
Angela B. Coon – vocals
Paul Dal Porto – horn, sitar; assistant engineer
Jindra Dolansky – saxophone
Matt Embrie – synthesizer, piano
Jab – trumpet

Additional production and design
Penny Allman – "The Queen of Oakland" photography 
Per Frykdahl – "Baby Fatty" cover art
Lorrie Murray – Design, photography, manager, booking agent
Brad Caswell - Lights
Mark Stichman – assistant engineer

References

1997 albums